Pacharia is a village in Kamrup, situated in north bank of river Brahmaputra .

Transport
Pacharia is accessible through National Highway 31. All major private commercial vehicles ply between Pacharia and nearby towns.

See also
 Nizdemoria
 Nawkata

References

Villages in Kamrup district